Ayman Jumean (born 14 March 1961) is a Jordanian fencer. He competed in the individual foil event at the 1984 Summer Olympics, losing all five of his bouts by identical scores of 5-0.

References

External links
 

1961 births
Living people
Jordanian male foil fencers
Olympic fencers of Jordan
Fencers at the 1984 Summer Olympics
20th-century Jordanian people